{{Taxobox
| name = "Aliihoeflea"
| domain = Bacteria
| phylum = Pseudomonadota
| classis = Alphaproteobacteria
| ordo = Hyphomicrobiales
| familia = Phyllobacteriaceae
| genus = "'''Aliihoeflea"| genus_authority = Roh et al. 2008
| type_species = 
|subdivision_ranks = Species
|subdivision = "A. aestuarii"
}}"Aliihoeflea"'  is a genus of bacteria from the family of Phyllobacteriaceae with one known species ("Aliihoeflea aestuarii''").

References

Phyllobacteriaceae
Bacteria genera
Monotypic bacteria genera